The Siemens–Duewag U2 is a type of light rail vehicle (LRV), built by consortium of Siemens, Duewag and Wegmann & Co built between 1968 and 1990.

The design was based on the prototype U1 tram built in 1965 for the Frankfurt U-Bahn. The U2 was also designed for and used by the Frankfurt U-Bahn. The name is derived from the class identifier given to the cars in the Frankfurt.

The U2 was later exported to North America and adapted for use on light rail systems in Edmonton, Calgary, and San Diego, during a period in which few purpose-built LRVs were being manufactured.

History

U1 prototype

In the early 1960s, Duewag developed and manufactured a prototype of a new tram for the Frankfurt U-Bahn. The design was largely based on the previously delivered trams, but added electronic controls that allowed several railcars to be coupled together to form trains, and a floor height of  that made it possible to board from platforms with a height of  without having to add a folding step previously used. The new car was debuted at the International Transport Exhibition in Munich in 1965 and two vehicles arrived in Frankfurt in May 1966. There was no further production of the U1, and they were only used in regular service for a few years before being retired in 1976 because of their incompatibility with the rest of the fleet.

U1 production vehicles
With the experience learned from the two prototypes, several changes were made for the production series of cars. 

The vehicles were built by consortium of Siemens, Duewag and Wegmann & Co. Duewag was the primary developer and manufacturer, Siemens provided the electrical equipment, and Wegmann did some assembly under contract.

The U2 vehicle was originally developed for the light rail system in Frankfurt. Its design was later used for systems in Edmonton and Calgary. The model was chosen for operations in San Diego in 1979, however, the planned platform level was lower than their counterpart system, so a street-level version was developed, and 71 vehicles were eventually delivered in stages.

In Mendoza
San Diego Metropolitan Transit System exported 11 cars to the Metrotranvia Mendoza system in Argentina in early 2010. These cars entered service in 2012 with a further 24 for expansion and parts donors following later that year.

Refurbishment
Edmonton Transit Service refurbished all 37 of its U2s to extend their operational life by another 10 years. Upgrades included overhauls to the mechanical and electrical systems, the addition of new LED interior and exterior destination signs, additional speakers to improve sound volume, and retrofits for CBTC operation for the Metro Line. Refurbishment was done by Bombardier Transportation in Buffalo, New York.

Retirement
In 2010, the San Diego Metropolitan Transit System sold 35 cars to Mendoza, Argentina, followed by the bulk of its U2 fleet retiring in 2013, when the Orange Line received low-floor cars. The remainder were used on its initial operating segment until January 2015. In 2016, two cars were shipped to Texas for use at a dog training facility, The majority of the U2's had left the property by 2018, having been either scrapped or donated to museums, with car 1001 being retained.

After 48 years of service, the last Frankfurt examples were retired in April 2016. The Frankfurt cars have been replaced by Bombardier Flexity Swifts, there are three cars left for museum purposes.

Calgary Transit has begun a similar retirement system as they have begun to introduce the Siemens S200 as both a replacement and expansion of the fleet. The city has begun to explore additional disposition options. The U2s in Calgary had been retired in 2016 but there are still 40 in service out of 83 DCs and 2 ACs.

Edmonton Transit Service has announced that its 37 U2s will be replaced by 2030, as they intend to procure new LRV's between 2023-2024. They have also stated that they are looking into preserving at least one vehicle for their historical fleet.

Technical details
In the US and Canada, usually up to five U2 cars are coupled to run as a train. Calgary Transit regularly couples up six U2 cars to shuttle them from Anderson Garage to Haysboro storage. These unique shuttle trains can be commonly seen after the evening rush hour. Each articulated car has a total passenger capacity of 264 passengers.

Frankfurt U2 cars use Scheren (diamond) or single-arm (z-shaped) pantographs, while Calgary, Edmonton and San Diego vehicles use the latter style pantograph exclusively.

Variants

Siemens-Duewag Type U3 is an upgraded version of the U2 with a slightly longer length and cosmetic changes. Introduced in 1977, they entered service in 1980 and will be exported to Monterrey in Mexico, after being retired from service by Germany's Frankfurt U-Bahn. Three examples will be preserved for museum service

Siemens-Duewag Type U2A on Sacramento Regional Transit's light rail system is an upgraded version of the U2 that shares similar characteristics of the newer SD-100s and SD-160s, yet it still uses the mechanical equipment of the U2.

Siemens also developed a U2 running on alternating current motors using inverters (nicknamed the U2-AC). 2 units were purchased by the Government of Alberta in 1988 and operated as demo units for Edmonton and Calgary. Calgary ended up adding the two units to their main fleet until 2015, when both were retired due to part issues. One of the units is still active as a track inspection vehicle, while the other was scrapped for spare parts.

Two variants, designated U2h and U2e, were locally created during the early 2000s in Frankfurt to serve different platform heights on the network. Originally the trains were designed to serve platforms of  height, with one large step at each door.

U2 cars acquired, by city
 Calgary (C-Train) — 85 cars (83 U2-DC, and 2 U2-AC acquired from Edmonton)
 Edmonton (Edmonton Light Rail Transit) — 37 cars, 2 U2-AC cars operated as demonstrators between 1988 and 1990, plus 3 parts cars acquired from Calgary.
Retrofitted to have electronic LED destination signs on the exterior and interior among other changes, including introducing moving block communications-based train control systems installed by Thales which allow the trains to run in a fully automated mode
 Frankfurt (Public transport in Frankfurt am Main) — 104 cars; U2 cars completely retired from service as of 2016.
 San Diego (San Diego Trolley) — 71 cars; U2 cars completely retired from service on the San Diego Trolley on January 26, 2015
 Mendoza (Metrotranvía Mendoza) — 18 cars (purchased used from San Diego)

U2a cars acquired, by city

 Sacramento (Sacramento Regional Transit District Light Rail) - 26 cars

Preservation
San Diego MTS retired their last U2 vehicles in January 2015, coinciding with low floor S70 cars being deployed on its Blue Line, six examples are preserved by various museums and nonprofits. 
 San Diego Electric Railway Association (SDERA) - Car 1002, now on display in National City
 Southern California Railway Museum - Cars 1003 and 1008, operate regularly on the Museum system, independently and as a two-car train.
 Western Railway Museum - Cars 1017 and 1018, operate on museum excursions
 Rockhill Trolley Museum - Car 1019 operates regularly on the Museum system.

MTS has retained Car 1001 as part of its heritage fleet of light rail vehicles.  The car was unveiled as part of a celebration at 12th & Imperial on July 11, 2019, and re-entered service two days later. The car operates on the Silver Line, alongside San Diego PCC cars 529 and 530.

The City of Edmonton has stated that at least one U2 will be preserved and operational for their historical fleet. The City of Calgary is currently looking into putting one on static display.

Cars 303-305 of the Frankfurt system have also been preserved following retirement in 2016.

Gallery

See also
Other Siemens light rail vehicle models
 Siemens P2000
 Siemens SD-100 and SD-160
 Siemens SD-400 and SD-460
 Siemens SD660
 Siemens S700 and S70
 Siemens S200

See also

C-Train
Edmonton Light Rail Transit
Frankfurt U-Bahn
San Diego Trolley

References

Electric multiple units of the United States
Train-related introductions in 1968
Tram vehicles of Canada
Tram vehicles of Germany
Streetcars of the United States
Siemens tram vehicles
Tram vehicles of Argentina
600 V DC multiple units
750 V DC multiple units
Light rail vehicles
Electric multiple units of Canada
Duewag multiple units